The second round of CONCACAF matches for 2022 FIFA World Cup qualification was played on 12 and 15 June 2021.

Format
A total of six teams advanced from the first round and played home-and-away over two legs in three ties. The three winners advanced to the third round.

Schedule
The first and second legs were originally scheduled for March 2021, but were later rescheduled to June 2021 due to the COVID-19 pandemic.

Qualified teams
Note: Bolded teams qualified for the third round.

The second round ties were predetermined as follows:
Group A winner v Group F winner
Group B winner v Group E winner
Group C winner v Group D winner

The winners of Groups D–F hosted the first leg, while the winners of Groups A–C hosted the second leg.

Summary
The matches were played on 12 and 15 June 2021.
|}

Matches

El Salvador won 6–0 on aggregate and advanced to the third round.

Canada won 4–0 on aggregate and advanced to the third round.

Panama won 2–1 on aggregate and advanced to the third round.

Goalscorers

References

External links

Qualifiers – North, Central America and Caribbean: Matches, FIFA.com
World Cup Qualifying – Men, CONCACAF.com

2
Qual2
FIFA World Cup qualification - CONCACAF Second Round
FIFA World Cup qualification - CONCACAF Second Round, 2022
Canada at the 2022 FIFA World Cup